Immenstedt is a municipality in the district of Dithmarschen, in Schleswig-Holstein, Germany. Until 2008 it was part of the Amt Kirchspielslandgemeinde Albersdorf.

References

Dithmarschen